Patricia Ann Dodd (born April 7, 1948) is a former figure skater who competed in ladies' singles for Great Britain. She is a three-time British national champion (1969 to 1971) and finished 15th at the 1968 Winter Olympics. Other notable results included an 8th-place finish at the 1969 World Championships and 6th place at the 1970 and 1971 European Championships.

Results

References

British female single skaters
1948 births
Olympic figure skaters of Great Britain
Figure skaters at the 1968 Winter Olympics
Living people
Figure skaters from Toronto